Operation Caribbe is the Canadian Armed Forces contribution to the elimination of illegal trafficking in the Caribbean Sea and the eastern Pacific Ocean by organized crime. The operation began in 2006 and its mandate has been altered twice since then.

History
In 2005, Canada agreed to send CP-140 Aurora aircraft for maritime detection purposes in the Caribbean Sea. Operation Caribbe began in November 2006. In October 2010 the mission was expanded with the signing of a Memorandum of Understanding between Canada and the United States that allowed law enforcement detachments from the United States Coast Guard to operate from Canadian warships deployed on Operation Caribbe.

In January 2012, Operation Caribbe was folded into the umbrella operation, Operation Martillo, which is a joint multinational effort led by the United States to eliminate illicit trafficking in the Caribbean Sea, the eastern Pacific Ocean and the coastal areas of the Central American nations.

Command structure
Subject to the operational command of Operation Martillo, any forces assigned to Operation Caribbe are under the operational direction of the United States Southern Command's Joint Interagency Task Force South. For the Canadian Armed Forces, nation command is maintained by the Canadian Joint Operations Command. The Canadian forces deployed to Operation Caribbe thus far have been warships from the Royal Canadian Navy and CP-140 Auroras and crew from the Royal Canadian Air Force.

Mission
Canadian warships deployed on Operation Caribbe work in a support role, locating and tracking any vessels or targets of interest. Unless provided with law enforcement officers from the United States Coast Guard, the Canadian warships do not participate in the interdiction of those targets. The CP-140 Aurora aircraft and their crews patrol in international airspace over the Caribbean Sea, the Gulf of Mexico and the eastern Pacific Ocean to track targets of interest. They do not participate in the interdiction of suspicious targets.

Results

The warships intercepted more than 29 metric tons of illegal drugs.

In 2011, Algonquin, Toronto,  and seven CP-140 Auroras were deployed. St. John's aided  in recovering  of cocaine from a scuttled vessel. Toronto handed over a small boat to the Nicaraguan Navy which contained 68 bales of cocaine.

In 2012, Goose Bay, Kingston,  and CP-140 Aurora aircraft on five occasions were deployed. On 28 November 2012 Ottawa supported United States law enforcement personnel in boarding a suspicious fishing vessel. The boarding resulted in the seizure of 36 bales of cocaine weighing 1086 kilograms. Between 18 and 29 November, CP-140 Aurora crews assisted in the seizure, through surveillance and detection, of 144 bales of cocaine weighing .

In 2013, Ottawa, Kingston, Summerside, Preserver and four CP-140 Aurora aircraft and crew were deployed. Canadian participation resulted in the assistance of seizing  of illegal drugs during the year.

In 2014, Kingston,  and a CP-140 Aurora and crew have been deployed. Kingston and Glace Bay completed their six-week deployments and returned to Halifax, Nova Scotia in April 2014. While returning from the operation, Kingston had a small fire aboard, which was dealt with and no casualties were incurred.
Summerside joined Operation Caribbe in June. Beginning in September, Athabaskan joined the operation.

In January 2015,  deployed to the eastern Pacific Ocean as part of the operation. As of 25 February, four  vessels were deployed to the Caribbean; Whitehorse, Nanaimo, Goose Bay and Moncton. In March 2015, as part of Operation Caribbe, Goose Bay and the US frigate  along with Shawinigan, intercepted a vessel in the Caribbean Sea carrying  of cocaine. On 10 March, Nanaimo came across fifty  packets of cocaine floating in the ocean. Athabaskan sailed for the Caribbean on 16 April to take part in Operation Caribbe.

In October 2015,  deployed with Whitehorse off the Pacific coast of North America as part of Operation Caribbe. During their deployment, Brandon performed two seizures of smuggling vessels and Whitehorse one. The two ships returned to Canada in December.

In January 2016, Summerside and Moncton were ordered to the Caribbean as part of Operation Caribbe. On 25 March, in conjunction with the United States Navy destroyer , Edmonton intercepted drug smugglers in international waters off the coast of Central America. After being stopped the smuggling vessel attempted to dump its cargo overboard. Edmonton, working with a United States Coast Guard detachment, recovered 27 bales of cocaine equaling . Saskatoon moved to intercept a smuggling vessel the same day that had been reported by patrol aircraft. The boat was not found, however, Saskatoon recovered sixteen bales of cocaine totaling .

Nanaimo departed Esquimalt on 28 September 2017 and sailed to San Diego, California to embark a United States Coast Guard Law Enforcement Detachment (LEDET) before beginning patrols associated with Operation Caribbe in the Eastern Pacific. On 31 October, Nanaimo intercepted a suspect vessel and her LEDET unit boarded the boat, seizing  of cocaine. Nanaimo intercepted a further  of cocaine in the following weeks. In November, Moncton was in the Caribbean to take part in Operation Caribbe. On 11 November, Moncton intercepted a suspect vessel, and her embarked United States Coast Guard LEDET unit boarded the vessel, seizing  of illegal cocaine.

In 2018, Edmonton and Whitehorse deployed south into the eastern Pacific Ocean as part of Operation Caribbe. Edmonton and Whitehorse returned to Esquimalt on 3 May. In mid-2018, it was reported that detainees taken aboard Canadian ships while under U.S. control were mistreated after being transferred aboard United States Coast Guard vessels before they arrived on shore.

In 2019, Whitehorse and  both deployed to the Pacific as part of Operation Caribbe.

References

Sources
 

Caribbe
Canada–Caribbean relations